KFLS may refer to:

 KFLS (AM), a radio station (1450 AM) licensed to Klamath Falls, Oregon, United States
 KFLS-FM, a radio station (96.5 FM) licensed to Tulelake, California, United States